Volker Schlöndorff (born 31 March 1939) is a German film director, screenwriter and producer who has worked in Germany, France and the United States. He was a prominent member of the New German Cinema of the late 1960s and early 1970s, which also included Werner Herzog, Wim Wenders, Margarethe von Trotta and Rainer Werner Fassbinder.

He won an Oscar as well as the Palme d'Or at the 1979 Cannes Film Festival for The Tin Drum (1979), the film version of the novel by Nobel Prize-winning author Günter Grass.

Early life 

Volker Schlöndorff was born in Wiesbaden, Germany to the physician Dr. Georg Schlöndorff. His mother was killed in a kitchen fire in 1944. His family moved to Paris in 1956, where Schlöndorff won awards at school for his work in philosophy. He graduated in political science at the Sorbonne, while at the same time studying film at the Institut des Hautes Etudes Cinematographiques, where he was friends with Bertrand Tavernier and met Louis Malle. Malle gave him his first job as his assistant director on Zazie in the Metro (1960), which continued with the films A Very Private Affair (1962), The Fire Within (1963) and Viva Maria! (1965). Schlöndorff also worked as assistant director on Alain Resnais's Last Year at Marienbad and Jean-Pierre Melville's Léon Morin, Priest (both 1961). During this time he also made his first short film, Who Cares? about French people living in Frankfurt in 1960. He collaborated with filmmaker Jean-Daniel Pollet on the 40-minute documentary Méditerranée released in 1963. The film has been highly regarded since its initial release, gaining praise from Jean-Luc Godard and consistently appearing in the popular book 1001 Movies You Must See Before You Die.

Early film career 

Schlöndorff returned to Germany to make his feature film debut Young Törless (Der junge Törless, 1966). Produced by Louis Malle and based on the novel The Confusions of Young Törless by Robert Musil, the film debuted at the 1966 Cannes Film Festival. Taking place at a semi-military Austrian boarding school, Törless witnesses the bullying of a fellow student but does nothing to prevent it despite his superior and mature intellect. He gradually begins to accept his personal responsibility for the abuse by doing nothing to stop it and runs away from the school. The comparison to pre-war Germany were obvious and the film was highly praised upon release, winning the FIPRESCI Prize at Cannes.

The New German Cinema movement unofficially began in 1962 with the Oberhausen Manifesto, calling new young German filmmakers to revitalize filmmaking in Germany, much like the French New Wave of the previous few years. Although not among the initial group of filmmakers involved, Schlöndorff was quick to align himself with the group and Young Törless is considered one of the most important films of the New German Cinema.

Schlöndorff's next film was A Degree of Murder (1967), a counter-culture-saturated film with a musical score by Rolling Stones guitarist Brian Jones. The film stars Jones' then girlfriend Anita Pallenberg as a young waitress who accidentally kills her boyfriend and hides the body with the help of two male friends. The film was very popular upon release amongst "swinging sixties" youths.

He then made another film that spoke to the counter-culture generation, Man on Horseback (Michael Kohlhaas – Der Rebell, 1969). Set in medieval Germany, Michael Kohlhaas is a horse trader who has been cheated by a local nobleman and nearly starts a revolution to get revenge. The film starred David Warner, Anna Karina and Anita Pallenberg, and was made in both German and English versions.

Schlöndorff then worked on Baal (1970), an adaptation for West German television of Bertolt Brecht's first play, and cast Rainer Werner Fassbinder in the lead role, along with Margarethe von Trotta, whom Schlöndorff would marry in 1971. Schlöndorff adapted the story of a self-destructive poet to modern-day Munich. He then made another TV movie The Sudden Wealth of the Poor People of Kombach (1971), again starring Fassbinder. The film depicts seven peasants in 19th-century Germany who rob the local tax collection cart but are so conditioned by their poverty that they cannot handle their newfound wealth.

 (1972) examined a group of people who have lost their sense of morals and co-starred von Trotta. Von Trotta would both star in and co-write Schlöndorff's next film, A Free Woman (Strohfeuer, 1972). The film took a feminist look at the condition of modern women in Munich. von Trotta portrays Elizabeth Junker, a recently divorced woman who must struggle to live her life independently as her husband has everything come easily to him, including the villa and son that they had shared together as a married couple. The film is loosely based on von Trotta's experiences with her divorce from her first husband.

Schlöndorff then completed the TV movie Stayover in Tirol (Übernachtung in Tirol, 1974); directed his first opera in Frankfurt, a production of Leoš Janáček's Káťa Kabanová, in the same year; and adapted the Henry James short story "Georgina's Reasons" as Les raisons de Georgina (1975) for French TV.

International success as a filmmaker 

Schlöndorff (and the New German Cinema movement as a whole) had his first financial hit film with The Lost Honor of Katharina Blum (1975). Based on the novel by Heinrich Böll, Schlöndorff both co-wrote and co-directed the film with Margarethe von Trotta, who made her directorial debut. The film stars Angela Winkler as Blum, who after falling in love and spending the night with a young army deserter becomes the victim of a corrupt police investigation and predatory tabloid newspaper, which cast her as both a terrorist and a prostitute. The newspaper is based upon the real right-wing German tabloid Bild-Zeitung, whose publisher Axel Springer was the inspiration for the character Werner Tötges.

In Schlöndorff's view, West Germany had fallen into political hysteria over the activities of a terrorist group, the Red Army Faction. The police and journalistic activities in both Böll's novel and Schlöndorff's film portrayed the Red Army Faction era as reminiscent of McCarthyism in the 1950s U.S., including illegal police raids, phone tapping and tabloid smears. Although Böll was heavily attacked after the publication of the novel, both novel and film were hugely successful in West Germany.

After directing his second opera We Come to the River in 1976, Schlöndorff followed The Lost Honor of Katharina Blum with the equally political Coup de Grâce (1976). Based on a novel by French author Marguerite Yourcenar, the film stars von Trotta (who again co-wrote the script) as Sophie von Reval, a young left-wing aristocrat who sides with the Bolshevik Revolution after being rejected by a young German soldier preparing to fight the Red Army in 1919. The film depicts the same time period and subject matter that von Trotta would later revisit in the film Rosa Luxemburg (1986).

A supporting actress in Coup de Grâce was Valeska Gert, a former cabaret dancer, circus performer and silent film actress who had worked with Greta Garbo and G. W. Pabst. This led to the documentary about her life, Just for Fun, Just for Play, in 1977.

Schlöndorff then contributed to the anthology film Germany in Autumn (1978), in which nine German filmmakers (including Rainer Werner Fassbinder, Alexander Kluge, Edgar Reitz and author Heinrich Böll) made short films depicting the hysteria and political chaos in West Germany during the German Autumn of 1977.

Schlöndorff's next film was the most successful and ambitious of his career: The Tin Drum, released in 1979. The film was based on the novel by Günter Grass, who for years had rejected proposed adaptations of his book until giving Schlöndorff his approval (and assistance) to make the film.

The Tin Drum stars David Bennent as the protagonist Oscar Matzerath, who, after receiving a tin drum on his third birthday, makes the conscious choice to stop growing and remain a three-year-old for the rest of his life. He hurls himself down a flight of stairs so as to give the adults around him a rational explanation for his handicap, and later discovers that he has the ability to tactically shatter glass with the power of his high-pitched scream, which he produces whenever anyone attempts to take his tin drum away from him. The film co-stars Angela Winkler as Oscar's mother, and Mario Adorf and Daniel Olbrychski as the German and Kashubian (Pole) who may both be his biological fathers. The film mostly takes place from the end of World War I to the end of World War II (when Oscar is 20) in the city of Danzig, Poland. Danzig is most famous for being the site of the first battle of the war, at the Post Office, in which Oscar takes part.

The film was widely hailed as a masterpiece and shared the Palme d'or at the 1979 Cannes Film Festival with Apocalypse Now, as well as winning the 1979 Oscar for Best Foreign Language Film.

Schlöndorff collaborated with Stefan Aust, Alexander Kluge and Alexander von Eschwege on the documentary The Candidate (1980), a film about the political campaign of arch-conservative Franz Josef Strauss. He next made The Circle of Deceit released in 1981. Based on the novel by Nicolas Born, the film concerns the politics and moral struggles of war photographers. The film stars Bruno Ganz and Jerzy Skolimowski as photojournalists covering the Lebanon Civil War in Beirut in 1975.

Hollywood and later career 

Schlöndorff's first English-language film was Swann in Love (1984), an adaptation of the first two volumes of Marcel Proust's In Search of Lost Time. The film was shot in France and financed by Gaumont, and stars Jeremy Irons, Ornella Muti, Alain Delon and Fanny Ardant.

Schlöndorff then went to the United States to make a TV adaptation of Arthur Miller's Death of a Salesman, starring Dustin Hoffman as Willy Loman and John Malkovich as Biff. Both actors won Emmys for their performances and Schlöndorff was nominated for an Emmy for his direction. The film premiered on television in 1985 and was released theatrically throughout Europe over the following years.

Schlöndorff followed this with another TV movie in the US, A Gathering of Old Men, based on the novel of the same name by Ernest J. Gaines. The film stars Richard Widmark, Holly Hunter and Lou Gossett Jr. and concerns racial discrimination in 1970s Louisiana.

Schlöndorff returned to theatrical films with the Hollywood science fiction film The Handmaid's Tale (1990). The film's story takes place in a dystopian near future in which most women are sterile due to pollution. Kate (Natasha Richardson) is arrested after attempting to flee to Canada and forced to become a "Handmaid". Handmaids are fertile women who are enslaved by the state and put in the households of wealthy men – who have "ceremonial" sex with them in the hope of conceiving a child. She becomes the Handmaid of the Commander (Robert Duvall), Fred, who is married to Serena Joy (Faye Dunaway). To save herself from execution, Kate – renamed "Offred", since she now is attached to Fred's household – allows the Commander's driver (Aidan Quinn) to impregnate her and falls in love with him. The film was in competition at the 40th Berlin International Film Festival.

This was soon followed by Voyager (1991). The film stars Sam Shepard as a man who survives a plane crash, then finds the love of his life (Julie Delpy) on his next trip and begins to question the rationale of his good luck after having spent most of his life being cruel to others. The film was based on the novel Homo Faber by Max Frisch and was not a success at the box-office. He directed the concert film The Michael Nyman Songbook released in 1992.

The first of Schlöndorff's two documentaries on Austrian-born director Billy Wilder was Billy Wilder, How Did You Do It?, in which he and German critic Hellmuth Karasek interviewed Wilder about his career over the course of two weeks in 1988. It was aired on German TV in 1992, and shown on TCM in the USA under the title Billy Wilder Speaks in 2006. Schlöndorff had been a great admirer of Wilder for many years and sought his advice during the making of The Tin Drum.

Appalled at plans to destroy the historic film studios Babelsberg, Schlöndorff mounted a one-man campaign to save them in the early 1990s. He served as the chief executive for the UFA studio in Babelsberg between 1992 and 1997. During that time, he helped Jiang Wen finish editing his film In the Heat of the Sun (1994) in Germany, with the studio's full financial support. He also helped to get the film selected for the 51st Venice International Film Festival. In 1996 he contributed to the French TV series Lumière sur un massacre with the episode "Le parfait soldat".

Schlöndorff returned to Germany in to make The Ogre (1996), his most well-regarded feature film since The Tin Drum. Based on a novel by Michel Tournier and starring John Malkovich as the titular Abel Tiffauges, the film revisited many of the themes and time period of The Tin Drum. Tiffauges is a slow-witted French soldier who has been accused of child molestation. After being captured by the Nazis and put in an internment camp, he is made a servant at an elite German training camp and kidnaps local children, officially as a way to recruit them for the camp, but in his mind to protect them. The film was screened in competition at the 1996 Venice Film Festival and won the UNICEF award. The film was released in Germany in 1996 and gained positive reviews. On the audio commentary for The Tin Drum, Schlöndorff said that he had wanted to film a sequel to The Tin Drum, as the film was based only on the first two thirds of the novel. But because actor David Bennent was too old to reprise the role and he did not want to recast Oscar, he considers The Ogre to be an unofficial sequel to his masterpiece.

Schlöndorff returned to Hollywood for Palmetto (1998). In a noir plot, the film stars Woody Harrelson as a falsely accused journalist who was sent to jail after uncovering corruption in the local government. After getting out of jail and unable to find work, he encounters Rhea Malroux (Elisabeth Shue), a femme fatale who propositions him to help her extort money from her millionaire husband. The film was not a financial success and was Schlöndorff's last film in the US to date.

Schlöndorff returned to Germany to make the film The Legend of Rita (2000). Loosely based upon the lives of members of the Red Army Faction who exiled to East Germany in the 1970s, the film centers around Rita, who most closely resembles real RAF member Inge Viett. Rita abandons the revolution and lives in East Germany under protection of the secret service, but after German reunification she faces the risk of discovery and consequences for her past crimes.

After the documentary Ein Produzent hat Seele oder er hat keine and a contribution to the omnibus film Ten Minutes Older (both in 2002), Schlöndorff made The Ninth Day (2004). The film is Schlöndorff's third film to center around World War II and is based on the diary of Father Jean Bernard. Ulrich Matthes plays Father Henri Kremer, a Catholic priest who is interned at Dachau concentration camp during the Second World War. He is inexplicably released for nine days and sent to Luxembourg. There he meets a young SS soldier who informs him that his mission there is to convince the local bishop to cooperate with the Nazi Party, in which case he will not be sent back to Dachau. He is thus faced with the moral dilemma of betraying his faith or returning to the concentration camp.

Schlöndorff next completed the TV movie  (2005). He returned to what was Danzig to film Strike (2006), a docudrama about labor strikes at the Gdańsk Shipyard during the Polish 1970 protests. The film is also a history of the Solidarity Movement in Poland leading up to the fall of Communism.

Schlöndorff's Ulzhan (2007) stars Philippe Torreton as a treasure hunter on his way home who has lost his soul and Ayanat Ksenbai as Ulzhan, the woman who falls in love with him. David Bennent also co-starred. In the summer of 2012, he worked with Andrew Turner, who had formerly been a runway model for the late Alexander McQueen. Schlöndorff's World War II-era film Diplomacy, dedicated to his friend Richard C. Holbrooke, debuted at the 64th Berlin International Film Festival. Set in 1944, it explores how the Swedish consul general in Paris, Raoul Nordling, helped persuade Dietrich von Choltitz, the German military governor of Paris, not to obey Hitler's orders to destroy the historic city should it fall into enemy hands.

Personal life 

Schlöndorff was married to fellow film director Margarethe von Trotta from 1971 to 1991 and helped raise her son from her first marriage. He is currently married to Angelika Schlöndorff, and the couple has one daughter.

He founded the production company Bioskop, which produced both his own and von Trotta's films.

In 1991, he was the Head of the Jury at the 41st Berlin International Film Festival.

Schlöndorff teaches film and literature at the European Graduate School in Saas-Fee, Switzerland, where he conducts an Intensive Summer Seminar.

Filmography

Features 

 1966: Young Törless
 1967: A Degree of Murder
 1969: Man on Horseback
 1971: The Morals of Ruth Halbfass
 1972: A Free Woman
 1975: The Lost Honor of Katharina Blum
 1976: Coup de Grâce
 1979: The Tin Drum
 1981: The Circle of Deceit
 1984: Swann in Love
 1990: The Handmaid's Tale
 1991: Voyager
 1996: The Ogre
 1998: Palmetto
 2000: The Legend of Rita
 2004: The Ninth Day
 2006: Strike
 2007: Ulzhan
 2012: Calm at Sea
 2014: Diplomacy
 2017: Return to Montauk

TV films 

 1970: Baal
 1971: The Sudden Wealth of the Poor People of Kombach
 1974: Übernachtung in Tirol
 1985: Death of a Salesman
 1987: A Gathering of Old Men
 2005:

Documentaries and shorts subjects 

 1960: Who cares? (short)
 1963: Méditerranée (documentary)
 1967: Der Paukenspieler (segment "Ein unheimlicher Moment")
 1975: The Novels of Henry James (TV series, episode "Georgina's Reasons")
 1977: Just for Fun, Just for Play (documentary)
 1978: Germany in Autumn (segment "Die verschobene Antigone")
 1980: The Candidate (documentary)
 1983: War and Peace (short)
 1992: Billy Wilder, How Did You Do It? (documentary, aka Billy Wilder Speaks)
 1992: The Michael Nyman Songbook (documentary)
 1996: Lumière sur un massacre (TV series, episode "Le parfait soldat")
 2002: Ein Produzent hat Seele oder er hat keine
 2002: Ten Minutes Older: The Cello (segment "The Enlightenment")

Awards 

 1978 Special Recognition award (shared) at the 28th Berlin International Film Festival for Germany in Autumn
 1979 Palme d'Or Cannes Film Festival The Tin Drum
 1980 Academy Awards Best Foreign Language Film The Tin Drum
 2004 Bavarian Film Awards Honorary Award 
 2009 Camerimage Lifetime Achievement Award
 2019 Commander's cross of the Order of Merit of the Federal Republic of Germany

Cultural references 

 Good Bye Schlöndorff, a performance by Lebanese artist and musician Waël Koudaih alias Rayess Bek based on extracts of Die Fälschung and audio tapes from the Lebanese Civil War.

See also 

 New German Cinema
 Cinema of Germany

References

Further reading 

 Moeller, Hans Bernhard and George Lellis, Volker Schlöndorff's Cinema: Adaptation, Politics and the "Movie Appropriate" . Carbondale: Southern Illinois University Press, 2002.

External links 

 Volker Schlöndorff Faculty Website @ European Graduate School. Biography and bibliography.
 
 Volker Schlöndorff's Cinématon – A 4 minutes online portrait by Gérard Courant
 Volker Schlöndorff Collection at Deutsches Filminstitut, Frankfurt (German)

1939 births
Living people
People from Wiesbaden
Mass media people from Hesse
Academic staff of European Graduate School
Best Director German Film Award winners
Members of the Academy of Arts, Berlin
Directors of Best Foreign Language Film Academy Award winners
Directors of Palme d'Or winners
Commanders Crosses of the Order of Merit of the Federal Republic of Germany